SUSS is the Singapore University of Social Sciences.

SUSS, Suss or Süss may refer to:

 Süß, a German surname, including a list of people with the name
 Wilhelm Süss (1895-1958), mathematician
 "Suss", a word deriving from the Sus law in England and Wales

See also
 
 SUS (disambiguation)
 Suess (disambiguation)